Old Brook is a small watercourse in Shaw and Crompton in the Metropolitan Borough of Oldham, Greater Manchester in the northwest of England. It flows from Crow Knowl on Crompton Moor to the River Beal. Its main feature is a waterfall at Pingot Quarry.

Tributaries
Brushes Brook (formerly Leornardin Brook)

Gallery

References

Rivers of the Metropolitan Borough of Oldham
2